Brian Wong is a Canadian politician, who was elected to the Nova Scotia House of Assembly in the 2021 Nova Scotia general election. He represents the riding of Waverley-Fall River-Beaver Bank as a member of the Progressive Conservative Association of Nova Scotia.

He previously ran in the same district in the 2013 Nova Scotia general election, losing to Bill Horne.

On August 31, 2021, Wong was made Minister of Advanced Education.

References

Year of birth missing (living people)
Living people
Progressive Conservative Association of Nova Scotia MLAs
Members of the Executive Council of Nova Scotia
21st-century Canadian politicians
Canadian politicians of Chinese descent
People from Hants County, Nova Scotia